Mary Eleanora McCoy ( Delaney; January 26, 1846 – November 17, 1923) was an American philanthropist, organizer, and clubwoman. She is known for organizing the Michigan State Association of Colored Women.

Biography
McCoy née Delaney was born in 1846 in Lawrenceburg, Indiana. Sources differ on her exact birth date: January 26, 1846 or perhaps January 7, 1846. She was born in an Underground Railroad station, with one source naming her parents as "Jacob C. and Eliza Ann (Montgomery) Delaney, perhaps escaped slaves". She married twice, first to Henry Brownlow and then to Elijah McCoy. Elijah McCoy was an inventor and the subject of the phrase the real McCoy.

The McCoys settled in Detroit in the early 1880s. Mary McCoy was an active clubwoman. She was a member of the Twentieth Century Club of Detroit, the National Association for the Advancement of Colored People (NAACP), the Lydian Association of Detroit, and the Willing Workers. With Lucy Thurman, she organized the Michigan State Association of Colored Women (a chapter of the National Association of Colored Women (NACW)). Her philanthropy included participation in the establishment of the Sojourner Truth Memorial Association of Michigan which provided University of Michigan scholarships to children of former slaves. She served as vice president. She also funded the McCoy Home for Colored Children, as well as established the Phyllis Wheatley Home for Aged Colored Women in Detroit, serving as president.

By the early 1900s, McCoy was working for women's suffrage. She was a member of the Independent Women Voters and advocated for suffrage through her ongoing association with the NACW. She marched in the 1913 Woman Suffrage Parade in Washington D.C. In 1920, she attended the National American Woman Suffrage Association's Victory Convention in Chicago.

McCoy died on November 17, 1923, in Detroit. In 2012, she was inducted into the Michigan Women's Hall of Fame and in 2016 the Mary E. McCoy Post Office Building was dedicated in Detroit.

References

1846 births
1923 deaths
Philanthropists from Indiana
19th-century African-American women
19th-century American philanthropists
19th-century women philanthropists
20th-century American philanthropists
20th-century women philanthropists
African-American suffragists
American suffragists
People from Lawrenceburg, Indiana
Clubwomen